Sun Zhihong (born  October 16, 1965) is a Chinese mathematician, working primarily on number theory, combinatorics, and graph theory.

Sun and his twin brother Sun Zhiwei proved a theorem about what are now known as the Wall–Sun–Sun primes that guided the search for counterexamples to Fermat's Last Theorem.

External links
 Zhi-Hong Sun's homepage

1965 births
Living people
Mathematicians from Jiangsu
20th-century  Chinese mathematicians
21st-century  Chinese mathematicians
Number theorists
Academic staff of Huaiyin Normal University
Scientists from Huai'an
Educators from Huai'an
Chinese twins